Sacada acutipennis is a species of moth in the family Pyralidae. It was described by Embrik Strand in 1915.

Distribution
It is found in Cameroon.

References

Strand, E. (1915). "Einige exotische, insbesondere afrikanische Heterocera". Archiv für Naturgeschichte 81(A) (2): 129–134.

Chloephorinae